Basslet is a common name for several fishes and may refer to:
Grammatidae, a family with species known as basslets
Howellidae, a family known as oceanic basslets
Serranidae, a family with species known as basslets or fairy basslets